There have been two baronetcies created for persons with the surname Cory, both in the Baronetage of the United Kingdom. One creation is extant as of 2007.

The Cory Baronetcy, of Llantarnam Abbey in the County of Monmouth, was created in the Baronetage of the United Kingdom on 27 November 1907 for the businessman and Liberal politician Clifford Cory. He was head of Cory Brothers & Company Ltd, colliery proprietors and oil refiners, and represented St Ives in the House of Commons. The title became extinct on his death in 1941.

The Cory Baronetcy, of Coryton in Whitchurch in the County of Glamorgan, was created in the Baronetage of the United Kingdom on 13 May 1919 for the businessman and Conservative politician Herbert Cory. He was a director of John Cory and Sons, shipowners, and sat as member of parliament for Cardiff and Cardiff South.

Cory baronets, of Llantarnam Abbey (1907)
Sir Clifford John Cory, 1st Baronet (1859–1941)

Cory baronets, of Coryton (1919)
Sir (James) Herbert Cory, 1st Baronet (1857–1933)
Sir Herbert George Donald Cory, 2nd Baronet (1879–1935)
Sir Vyvyan Donald Cory, 3rd Baronet (1906–1941)
Sir Clinton James Donald Cory, 4th Baronet (1909–1991)
Sir (Clinton Charles) Donald Cory, 5th Baronet (1937-2022)
Sir James Maurice Perkins Cory, 6th Baronet (born 1966)

Notes

References
Kidd, Charles, Williamson, David (editors). Debrett's Peerage and Baronetage (1990 edition). New York: St Martin's Press, 1990,

External links
Photograph of Sir Clifford Cory, 1st Baronet

Baronetcies in the Baronetage of the United Kingdom
Extinct baronetcies in the Baronetage of the United Kingdom